Chew Chong Sin is a Malaysian politician from DAP. He is the Member of Johor State Legislative Assembly for Mengkibol since 2018.

Early career 
Chew is a former bank manager in Kuala Lumpur, Asia Pacific region manager of a German company and Director of BPP Professional Education (United Kingdom), China branch. He was also a businessman in Shanghai.

He was also the Chairman of Chinese Student in UKM Committee and Secretary of Civil Rights Committee for The KL & Selangor Chinese Assembly Hall.

Political career 
When he was in Shanghai, Chew established “Bersih Shanghai” in 2012, which actively campaigned ‘Jom Balik Undi’ (Go Back and Vote) in other countries. Bersih Shanghai had held several forums with other NGOs, activist and Malaysian political leaders to share their thoughts to Malaysians in Shanghai.

He is also a columnist who shares his opinion on current issues and economic issues in “Mirror of Shanghai” for Oriental Daily.

In July 2013, he returned to Malaysia and started campaigning with DAP during the 2013 Malaysian general election. Before that, he also helped the opposition to campaign in the 1999 and 2004 Malaysian general election.

In 2018, he joined DAP and contested in the 2018 Malaysian general election as a Pakatan Harapan candidate and was chosen as the Member of Johor State Legislative Assembly for Mengkibol.

Election result

Controversies 
On 15 March 2019, Chew Chong Sin said that the Christchurch mosque shootings should be a lesson for Malaysia in racial and religious issues, for instance the collaboration between UMNO and PAS. After that, he retracted his statement due to misinterpretation.

Reference 

People from Johor
University of Malaya alumni
National University of Malaysia alumni
Democratic Action Party (Malaysia) politicians
Members of the Johor State Legislative Assembly
Malaysian people of Chinese descent
Living people
1973 births